Global studies (GS) is the interdisciplinary study of global macro-processes. Predominant subjects are global politics, economics, and law, as well as ecology, geography, culture, anthropology and ethnography. It distinguishes itself from the related discipline of international relations by its comparatively lesser focus on the nation state as a fundamental analytical unit, instead focusing on the broader issues relating to cultural and economic globalisation, global power structures, as well of the effect of humans on the global environment.

Characteristics of global studies 
Six defining characteristics of global studies were identified by scholars at the first annual meeting of the Global Studies Consortium in Tokyo in 2008:
 Transnationality; which highlights the focus on global processes; rather than the connections between individual states studied in international relations;
 Interdisciplinary: global studies scholarship can involve politics, economics, history, geography, anthropology, sociology, religion, technology, philosophy, health as well as the study of the environment, gender, and race;
 Contemporary and historical examples range from the transnational activity of the Greek and Roman Empires to modern European colonialism;
 Postcolonial and Critical-theoretical in its approach: global studies often emphasizes a postcolonial perspective, and attempts to analyze global phenomena through a critical-theoretical, multicultural lens. This includes criticising perspectives of eurocentrism and orientalism in traditional conceptual frameworks.

History and context 

The development of global studies in secondary and tertiary education is arguably a product of globalization, and its consequent results on the international community. In the late 20th century, an unprecedented rise in communications technologies and computerization occurred around the world, again enhancing the processes of globalization: “it is a shift in our very life circumstances ... the speed of change is closely allied to the growth of communication, and development in information and communication technologies have been exponential ... globalization is a fact of life from which we cannot retreat.”. As a result of this constantly changing global community, education providers began to see a need for the introduction of global studies into secondary school curricula (i.e. introduction of  global issues  through already existing subjects), and to create global studies degrees for tertiary students (i.e. sole degrees with a global focus).

According to Jan Nederveen Pieterse, Mellichamp Professor of Global Studies and Sociology at the University of California, Santa Barbara:The first Global Studies conference took place at the University of Illinois Chicago in 2008; the 2009 conference was held in Dubai on the theme Views from Dubai: The Gulf and Globalization. The 2010 conference was in Busan, South Korea under the heading Global Rebalancing: East Asia and Globalization; the 2011 conference took place in Rio de Janeiro on Emerging societies and Emancipation; the 2012 conference was at Moscow University on the theme of Eurasia and  Globalization: Complexity  and Global studies; and the 2013 conference took place in New Delhi on the theme of Social Development in South Asia.The Global Studies Journal was founded in 2008 and is "devoted to mapping and interpreting new trends and patterns in globalization".

Subjects of interest 
The field of global studies revolves around the impacts of globalization and the growing interdependence of states, economies, societies, cultures, and people.  Some of the most pressing issues in global studies are national security and diplomacy, effective citizenship in a participatory democracy, global competitiveness in a world market and the desire to enter the aid and development sector.

National security 
The first major funding for international education was the 1966 International Education Act in the US.  It provided funding to institutions of higher education to create and strengthen international studies programs.  Created at the time of the Cold War, this act stressed the need for all citizens (with a focus on USA citizens) to understand global issues in order to build skills for diplomacy.”The importance of diplomacy as a driving force for political development is well known and understood. It is of great importance as a long term instrument for conflict prevention.”

The development of issues and crisis on a global scale such as international terrorism, climate change and environmental degradation, pandemics (such as ebola), and the Great Recession have convinced policymakers of the importance of global studies and international education to national security and diplomacy.

Global economy 

A second motivation for global studies is facilitating a better understanding of the global marketplace.  Many international companies have identified the need for a workforce that has the skills to work cross-culturally and identify and serve the needs of a global market.  Some international companies, such as Microsoft, have taken the lead in convening policymakers and key stakeholders to demand additional investment in education. The US state and federal governments have also placed global studies as a key priority for preparing a competitive workforce. Furthermore, in 2002 the Australian federal government (through its development body AusAID) used some of its funding to introduce a ‘Global Education Program.’ This program aims to increase understanding of development and international issues among Australian students. It provides teachers with professional development opportunities with NGOs and thorough curriculum support. The program “informs and encourages teachers to introduce students to global issues in a classroom setting.” Higher education institutions have closely followed with integrating international studies across disciplines.  It is rare to find a leading business school without an international focus.

Global citizenship and rights 
A third motivation for global studies is the creation of an effective citizenry.  In the US, the National Council of Social Studies states that the purpose of social studies is to “teach students the content knowledge, intellectual skills, and civic values necessary for fulfilling the duties of citizenship in a participatory democracy.”  A key goal of the NCSS is “global education”.  As globalization causes the lines between national and international to become blurred, it becomes increasingly important for citizens to understand global relationships. The creation of effective Global citizenship results in people who are willing to, and have the capacity to become involved in local and global issues. In the UK, local government research conducted in the surrounding areas of London has found that citizens must have the opportunity to become involved and then possess the skill, knowledge and confidence to take part. The outcomes are often very positive, leading to an improvement in services, better quality of democratic participation and community education.
  
To achieve effective citizenship, students must be educated in ways that engage and place emphasis on the importance of global issues. By studying a subject such as global studies, students can gain the knowledge required to become effective citizens.

Some critical scholars note that beyond content, students must be taught "global cognition" in order to truly understand global perspectives.  These scholars believe that in order to fully understand world issues, students must recognize that their perspective is not necessarily shared by others and understand the social forces that influence their views.

International Institutions 
By 2006, the international development sector had expanded exponentially, with the “NGO sector now being the 8th largest economy in the world ... employing nearly 19 million paid workers." Financing health projects used to be the biggest issue in global aid, but private and public organizations like the Bill and Melinda Gates Foundation have helped overcome such problems. The issue now is making sure that the money is used in a proper manner to help those in need of the primary essentials of life. Studying global studies may lead to involvement in the aid and development sector in multiple ways. These can include working in post-conflict or natural disaster zones, improving public services in developing communities (health, education, infrastructure, agriculture) or aiding private sector growth through business and market models.

See also 
 Engaged theory
 Globalism
 Global justice
 Globalization
 International relations
 Futurology
 Global Studies Consortium

References 

 
 Global studies
Higher education
Interdisciplinary subfields of sociology